In 1520 A.D. Rana Sanga led a coalition of Rajput armies to invade Gujarat. He reinstated Raimal Rathore as the Rao of Idar and defeated the Gujarat forces under the command of Nizam Khan. Rana Sanga drove the army of Muzaffar II deep into Gujarat and chased them up to Ahmedabad. The Sultan of Gujarat was forced to flee to Muhammadabad.

Background
The growing power of Mewar was seen as a threat by the Sultan of Gujarat. They had previously had disputes due to the succession of the state of Idar. In 1519 the two claimants of Idar, Raimal and Bharmal both sought the support of Sanga and Muzaffar II, leading to the invasion of Idar by the Gujarat forces, who were supporting Bharmal.

Battle
Upon knowing of the invasion, Rana Sanga immediately came to the support of Raimal Rathore and a battle was fought in Idar where the Sultans forces were defeated by the Rana. The Gujarat army were pushed back as far as Ahmedabad.

Aftermath
This defeat led to the alliance between the sultanates of Gujarat, Malwa and Delhi against Mewar. The two Sultans of Malwa and Gujarat led their forces to Mandsaur where they failed to take the fort and were forced to retreat. The sultan of Delhi tried to annex Ajmer but was defeated at Ranthambore.

References

History of Rajasthan
Mewar dynasty
Rajput rulers
History of Gujarat
Battles involving the Rajputs